Craggy Island is a fictional island, supposedly off the west coast of Ireland, which serves as the primary setting for the Channel 4 sitcom Father Ted. Craggy Island Parochial House is located on the island, which is the home of three Catholic priests – Father Ted Crilly, Father Dougal McGuire and Father Jack Hackett – as well as their housekeeper Mrs Doyle. It is mentioned the Irish state have given the British government permission to use the island's coast as a dumping ground for nuclear waste.

Development 
County Clare, in the province of Munster, Ireland, was chosen as the primary filming location for Father Ted in 1993. Location manager Joe Mardis was at a pub in the village of Kilfenora when he realised that the exposed karst landscapes of northern County Clare, such as the Burren, could easily be portrayed as an island. Mardis looked at a number of older houses in Clare, photographed them and brought them for writers Graham Linehan and Arthur Mathews. Glenquin House was chosen for the exterior shots of the parochial house.

Information 
Craggy Island is a remote, desolate place, supposedly located off the west coast of Ireland. The island is inhabited by Irish locals, a Chinese community and one Māori. The island's weather is often bleak and harsh storms are very common. The landscape consists of mainly rocky cliffs and grass fields, and many stone walls and fences divide the island.

The island's buildings are very old and run down. There is a one-way road connecting the whole island but there are few vehicles. There is a church and parochial house - in which the three priests and Mrs Doyle live. In terms of shops and establishments, the island features a cinema, an internet café, an isolation tank, a post office, a greyhound racing track, a very small golf course and a pub. There is also a Chinatown and a few large buildings in the town centre.

Locations

Craggy Island Parochial House 
The parochial house is a Georgian style period property, and the main location for the series, situated in isolation on Craggy Island. The three priests ended up there as punishments for different reasons.

Points of interest 

 The Field - ''Good Luck, Father Ted''
 Holy Stone of Clonrichert - ''Tentacles of Doom''
 The Magic Road - ''Hell''
 St. Kevin's Stump - ''Hell''

Neighbouring island 
Rugged Island is the home of Father Dick Byrne, Father Cyril MacDuff and Father Jim Johnson. The three inhabitant priests are warped versions of Ted, Dougal and Jack, and the two islands are constantly competing against each other.

"The real Craggy Island" 
A dispute between the three constituent Aran Islands in Galway Bay, off the west coast of Ireland, began in early 2007. Inishmore, Inishmaan and Inisheer engaged in a battle, aiming to be labelled as 'the real Craggy Island'. The battle for tourist revenues and a quest for authenticity has been pursued by fans through Father Ted film clips since. A three-day Father Ted festival, staged on Inishmore, prompted inhabitants of the island to claim kinship with the genuine Craggy Island. The event, known as Ted Fest, or The Friends of Father Ted Festival, has since taken place on the island every year since, and events include Priest’s Dance Off, The Lovely Girls competition and Ted’s Got Talent.

References

External links

Father Ted
Fictional islands